The 2020–21 season is Vanoli Cremona's 23rd in existence and the club's 11th consecutive season in the top tier Italian basketball.

Players

Kit 
Supplier: Errea / Sponsor: Vanoli

Current roster

Depth chart

Squad changes

In

{{bs in2 player
 | bg       = 
 | n        = 1
 | pos      = C
 | nat      = SEN
 | p        = Malik Dime
 | age      = 
 | fc       = Maccabi Rishon LeZion
 | fcc      = ISR
 | type     = 1 year
 | contract = June 2022
 | fee      = Free
 | date     = 2 December 2021
 | ref      = <ref>

|}

Out

|}

Confirmed 

|}

Coach

Unsuccessful deals 
The following deal never activated and the player's contract was withdrawn before the beginning of the season.

Competitions

Supercup

Serie A

References 

2021–22 in Italian basketball by club